Short's Tavern is a historic building in Swansea, Massachusetts.  In form it is a three-quarter Georgian house,  stories in height and four bays across, with a side gable roof and a central chimney.  The main entrance is flanked by pilasters and topped by a transom window and gabled pediment.  The house was built c. 1742 as a farm house, and was acquired 1851 by James Short, who operated a tavern on the premises, capitalizing on its location along what was then a major county road.

The building was listed on the National Register of Historic Places in 1990.

See also
National Register of Historic Places listings in Bristol County, Massachusetts

References

Taverns in Massachusetts
Drinking establishments on the National Register of Historic Places in Massachusetts
Buildings and structures in Bristol County, Massachusetts
National Register of Historic Places in Bristol County, Massachusetts
Houses in Bristol County, Massachusetts
Swansea, Massachusetts